Sarvepalli Assembly constituency is a constituency of the Andhra Pradesh Legislative Assembly, India. It is one of 08 constituencies in the Nellore district.

Kakani Govardhan Reddy of Yuvajana Sramika Rythu Congress Party is currently representing the constituency.

Mandals

Members of Legislative assembly

Election results

Assembly elections 2019

Assembly elections 2014

Assembly Elections 2009

Assembly Elections 2004

Assembly elections 1999

Assembly elections 1994

Assembly elections 1989

Assembly elections 1985

Assembly elections 1983

Assembly elections 1978

Assembly elections 1972

Assembly elections 1967

Assembly elections 1962

Assembly elections 1955

 List of constituencies of Andhra Pradesh Legislative Assembly

See also
 List of constituencies of Andhra Pradesh Vidhan Sabha

References

Assembly constituencies of Andhra Pradesh